The Scarecrow is a 1920 American two-reel silent comedy film starring Buster Keaton, and written and directed by Keaton and Edward F. Cline.

Plot
Buster plays a farmhand who competes with his housemate (Roberts) to win the love of the farmer's daughter (Sybil Seely). Running from a dog that he believes is rabid, he races around brick walls, jumps through windows, and falls into a hay thresher that rips off most of his clothes. He is forced to borrow a scarecrow's clothes in a nearby field. He then trips into a kneeling position while tying his shoes, and Sybil believes he is proposing marriage. They speed off on a motorcycle, with Joe and the farmer (played by Buster's father, Joe) in hot pursuit. Scooping up a minister during the chase, they are married on the speeding motorcycle and splash into a stream, where they are pronounced man and wife.

Cast
 Buster Keaton as Farmhand #1
 Edward F. Cline as Hit-and-Run Truck Driver (uncredited)
 Luke the Dog as The "Mad" Dog (uncredited)
 Joe Keaton as Farmer (uncredited)
 Joe Roberts as Farmhand #2 (uncredited)
 Sybil Seely as Farmer's Daughter (uncredited)
 Al St. John as Man with Motorbike (uncredited)

See also
 List of American films of 1920
 Buster Keaton filmography

References

External links

 
 
 The Scarecrow on YouTube
 
 The Scarecrow at the International Buster Keaton Society

1920 films
1920 comedy films
American silent short films
American black-and-white films
Films directed by Buster Keaton
Films directed by Edward F. Cline
1920 short films
Silent American comedy films
Films produced by Joseph M. Schenck
Films with screenplays by Buster Keaton
Articles containing video clips
1920s American films